This is a list of museums located in Cyprus by district.

Famagusta
Thalassa-Municipal Museum of the Sea in Ayia Napa
Tornaritis-Pierides Museum of Marine Life in Ayia Napa
Namık Kemal Dungeon

Larnaca
Larnaka Castle
Larnaka District Museum
Municipal Art Gallery
Museum of Traditional Embroidery and Silversmith-work, Lefkara
Pieridis Museum

Limassol
 Limassol District Archaeological Museum
 Cyprus Medieval Museum (Limassol Castle)
Cyprus Wine Museum
Lemesos (Limassol) District Museum
Local Kourion Museum, Episkopi
Pieridis Museum
Cyprus Historic and Classic Motor Museum (Classic Cars Museum)
Medflora Museum Cyprus

Nicosia
Loukia and Michael Zampelas Art Museum
Cyprus Classic Motorcycle Museum
Cyprus Museum
Cyprus Museum of Natural History
Cyprus Police Museum
Cyprus Postal Museum
Fikardou Village and Rural Museum
Ethnological Museum (The House of Hadjigeorgakis Kornesios)
Leventio Museum
Local Museum of Ancient Idalion
Museum of the History of Cypriot Coinage
NEU Museum of Classical and Sports Cars
Ethnographic Museum of Cyprus

Paphos
Folk Art Museum, Geroskipou
Local Museum of Marion-Arsinoe, Polis Chrysochous
Pafos District Museum
Pafos Ethnographical Museum

References

External links
Cyprus Department of Antiquities
Loukia and Michael Zampelas Art Museum
http://www.cyprus-archaeology.org.uk/museums.htm
Cyprus Tourism Organisation
Society of Cypriot Studies- Cyprus Folk Art Museum: http://www.cypriotstudies.org/English%20HTMLs/indexEN.html

 !
Cyprus
Museums
Museums
Museums
Cyprus
Cyprus